Lady Reading Hospital is located at Peshawar in the Khyber Pakhtunkhwa of Pakistan. It is also called Loye Huspatal (big hospital) and Gernali Huspatal. It is named after Lady Reading, the wife of the Viceroy of India, Lord Reading. It is the biggest hospital of Khyber Pakhtunkhwa province, providing tertiary care facilities.

Accredited hospital
Lady Reading Hospital is accredited by the College of Physicians and Surgeons of Pakistan.

Overview of history
It was established in 1924 and it is just 200 metres (220 yards) away in the south of the Grand Trunk Road, behind the famous historical Qila Balahisar. Famous Masjid Muhabat Khan, Ander Shehr bazaar, Qissa Khawani bazaar and Khyber bazaar is across the road of LRH. LRH is just outside historical wall in the jurisdiction of cantonment board.

The anecdote of the hospital of its coming into being is that His Excellency Lord Reading, viceroy of India from 1921 to 1926, happened to visit Peshawar. This was the highest office in British India ever attained by a Jew. He was accompanied by his spouse Lady Reading. She was fascinated by the view of the city from Qila Balahisar where they had lodged. She expressed her desire to see the city. The story, probably apocryphal is that she was provided with a horse in compliance with her desire. She visited the city. As she was returning to the fort the Lady Reading fell from her horse. This resulted in some injuries to the Lady Reading. Non-availability of medical aid instantly made her unconscious. She was rushed to Egerton Hospital where the facilities were scanty. Unable to deal with her injuries, she was shifted to the Royal Artillery Hospital now called "Combined Military Hospital" (or CMH) Peshawar, where she was given proper treatment. The immense impact of this incident on her made it imperative to construct a hospital. On retirement of Lord Reading in 1926 she came to Peshawar from Delhi and campaigned to construct a standard hospital in place of Egerton Hospital. She donated Rs. 52,000 for the construction. This new hospital was subsequently named Lady Reading Hospital.

Later on, the hospital was given into status of District Headquarters hospital with 150 beds and in 1930 it was a 200-bed hospital. Brierly Ward was added in 1936 named after Lt Col Sir Charles Brierly Chief Medical Officer of NWFP (IMS) and Inspector General of Civil Hospitals. Khan Bahadur Abdul Samad Khan became the first Medical Superintendent of the hospital. Muhammad Ayaz Khan was appointed the first Administrator of the hospital in 1973. This hospital became affiliated with Khyber Medical College in 1955 with medical, surgical, ENT, Eye and TB wards.

The hospital catchment population includes patients from all over the province, erstwhile tribal areas and Afghanistan as well. A 24/7 Accidents and Emergency department
According to an estimate, its out-patient clinic sees above 5500 patients per day and the casualty cases at the Accidents and Emergency department number more than 2500 or 3000 per day (as per 2018 data).

See also 
 Khyber Teaching Hospital Peshawar
 Hayatabad Medical Complex Peshawar

References

External links
 Lady Reading Hospital About Us

Hospitals in Peshawar
Hospital buildings completed in 1924
Hospitals established in 1924
1924 establishments in British India
British colonial architecture in India